Democratic Movement may refer to:
Brazilian Democratic Movement
Democratic Movement (France)
Democratic Movement (India)
Democratic Movement (Israel)
Democratic Movement (Italy)
Democratic Italian Movement
Democratic Movement (Nepal)
Democratic Movement (San Marino)
Democratic Movement of Kyrgyzstan

See also
Movement for Democracy (disambiguation)